Aleksey Dmitrievich Popov (Алексей Дмитриевич Попов; 1891-1961) was a leading Soviet theatre director who managed the Soviet Army Theatre between 1935 and 1960. He was awarded three Stalin Prizes and was named a People's Artist of the USSR in 1946. His son Andrei was also a notable actor.

Popov made his directorial debut in 1923 at Vakhtangov's studio and gained wide recognition as the chief director of the Revolution Theatre in 1931-35. After moving to the Red Army Theatre in 1935, Popov "perfected the bombastic style of the battle drama on the enormous firing range of a stage". Popov's theatre became known for monumental war-themed productions with expressionistic touches.

Popov was appointed Dean of the GITIS theatre academy shortly before his death.  He authored several lengthy theoretical works and a book of memoirs. His disciples include Anatoly Efros and Leonid Kheifets.

References 

1891 births
1961 deaths
Soviet theatre directors
People's Artists of the USSR
Theatre theorists
Stalin Prize winners
Recipients of the Order of Lenin
Burials at Novodevichy Cemetery
Soviet drama teachers
Communist Party of the Soviet Union members
People's Artists of the RSFSR
Soviet male silent film actors